The Muslim conquest of Khuzestan took place from 637/8 to 642, and ended with the acquisition of the rich Khuzestan Province by the Rashidun Caliphate.

History

Early Muslim incursions and the fall of Hormizd-Ardashir 
The Arabs started invading Khuzestan in 637/8—around the same time when Hormuzan, a nobleman of high status, had arrived to Hormizd-Ardashir after suffering several defeats to the Arabs in Asoristan. Hormuzan used the city as a base to mount his raids in Meshan against the Arabs. The young Sasanian king Yazdegerd III (r. 632-651) supported him in these raids, and believed that it was possible to regain the territories which had been taken by the Arabs. After some time, Hormuzan clashed with an Arab army to the west of Hormizd-Ardashir, but was easily defeated and retreated back to the city, where he asked for peace. The Arabs agreed in return for tribute, which Hormuzan accepted. However, he soon stopped paying tribute, and raised an army of Kurds (a term then used to describe Iranian nomads). Umar, who was caliph of the Rashidun Caliphate, responded by sending an army under Hurqus ibn Zuhayr al-Sa'di, who defeated Hormuzan in 638 at Hormizd-Ardashir, and forced the city to pay jizya . Meanwhile, Hormuzan fled to Ram-Hormizd. He then once again sought a peace treaty and was granted one in return for tribute.

However, he once again stopped paying tribute and continued his resistance, but was again defeated in a battle. Meanwhile, the cities of Khuzestan were slowly one-by-one conquered. Sometime later in 641, after a defeat at Ram-Hormizd, Hormuzan fled to Shushtar, and was defeated near the city, which cost him the lives of 900 of his men, while 600 were captured and would later be executed. Nevertheless, he managed to reach the city. The Arabs then laid siege to the city.

The Siege of Shushtar 

Fortunately for Hormuzan, Shushtar was well fortified due to the rivers and canals that surrounded it on almost all sides. One of them was known as Ardashiragan, named after the first Sasanian king Ardashir I (r. 224-240). Another known as Shamiram, named after the legendary Assyrian Queen Semiramis. The last one mentioned was known as Darayagan, named after the Achaemenid king Darius I (r. 550–486 BCE). There are several versions of how the city got captured; according to al-Tabari, during the siege, an Iranian defector named Sina (or Sinah) went to al-Nu'man and pleaded for his life to be spared in return for helping him how to show a way into the city. Al-Nu'man agreed, and Sina told him the following thing; "attack via the outlet of the water, and then you will conquer the city."

Al-Nu'man did as he told him, and with a small portion of his army, charged into Shushtar. Hormuzan then retreated to the citadel and continued his resistance, but was eventually forced to surrender. According to another version written in the Khuzestan Chronicle, similar to the version by al-Tabari, a defector from Qatar, along with another person, asked the Arabs for some of their plunder in exchange of how to enter the city. The Arabs agreed, and after some time, they managed to enter the city. According to al-Baladhuri, during the siege, the Arabs were reinforced with a group of professional Iranian elites under Siyah al-Uswari, known as the Asawira.

The reason for their defection was in order to preserve their status and wealth. However, according to the Khuzestan Chronicle, the Asawira first defected to the Arabs after they entered Shushtar. The brother of Hormuzan, Shahriyar, is said to have been a part of the Asawira. According to Pourshariati, the story of the Asawira helping the Arabs in their conquest of Khuzestan, may have been false. Hormuzan, after his surrender, was taken by the Arabs and brought to their capital, Medina.

The capture of Gundishapur 
According to most sources, Gundishapur was the last major city in Khuzestan that the Arabs conquered. According to al-Tabari and al-Baladhuri, Abu Musa Ashaari marched to Gundishapur and besieged the city in 642. The city didn't put much of a resistance, due its weak defence mechanism; only after a few days, the city surrendered and opened its gate. Abu Musa then made peace with the city in return for tribute, which the city accepted. However, some inhabitants of the city refused to live under the rule of the Rashidun Caliphate, and fled to Kalbaniyah. Abu Musa then went to the city and easily seized it. He thereafter seized a few other small cities, thus completing the conquest of Khuzestan.

Aftermath 
After the conquest of Khuzestan, the inhabitants of the province didn't put much of a resistance as much as the other Sasanian provinces did. The biggest rebellion that took place in the province was the rebellion of Piruz in 643/4, who was defeated in the same year at Bayrudh. This was due to the mixed population of the province, where "people were used to different cultures and various religions" (Jalalipour).

References

Sources 
 

 

 

7th century in Asia
Ahvaz
History of Khuzestan Province
Khuzestan